Casuariclystis is a genus of moths in the family Geometridae. It contains only one species, Casuariclystis latifascia, which is widespread. The range includes Borneo, the Andamans, Fiji, Rotuma Island, Vanuatu, New Caledonia, Hong Kong, the Ogasawara Islands, Kenya, Mauritius, Aldabra, and the Seychelles. The habitat consists of coastal areas, dry heath forests, limestone forests, oceanic islands, and dry secondary forests.

Adults are purplish dark brown, with a series of regular sinuous fasciae on both wings.

The larvae feed on Casuarina species.

References

Works cited
Natural History Museum Lepidoptera genus database

Moths described in 1866
Eupitheciini
Moths of Asia
Moths of Africa
Moths of Oceania
Monotypic moth genera